Santa Maria della Visitazione may be:
An alternative name for Santa Maria in Aquiro, Rome
Santa Maria della Visitazione:  church in Venice, also known as Santa Maria della Pietà.
A former name of the church of the Gesuati, formally Santa Maria del Rosario, in Venice.
Santa Maria della Visitazione al Ponte delle Lame, Bologna